The 2021 American Athletic Conference baseball tournament was held at BayCare Ballpark in Clearwater, Florida, from May 25 through 30. The event, held at the end of the conference regular season, determined the champion of the American Athletic Conference for the 2021 season.  The winner of the double-elimination tournament, South Florida, received the conference's automatic bid to the 2021 NCAA Division I baseball tournament.

Format and seeding
The top eight baseball teams in The American were seeded based on their records in conference play.  The tournament used a two bracket double-elimination format, leading to a single championship game between the winners of each bracket.

Bracket

References

Tournament
American Athletic Conference Baseball Tournament
Baseball competitions in Florida
American Athletic Conference baseball tournament
American Athletic Conference baseball tournament
College sports tournaments in Florida